Parry Sound was a federal electoral district represented in the House of Commons of Canada from 1904 to 1949. It was located in the province of Ontario. This riding was first created in 1903 from parts of Muskoka and Parry Sound riding.

It consisted of the territorial district of Parry Sound.

In 1933, it was expanded to include, in the territorial district of Nipissing, the townships of Ballantyne, Wilkes, Pentland, Boyd, Paxton, Biggar, Osler, Lister, Butt, Devine, Bishop, Freswick, McCraney, Hunter, McLaughlin, Bower, Finlayson, Peck, Canisbay and Sproule.

The electoral district was abolished in 1947 when it was merged into Parry Sound—Muskoka riding.

Members of Parliament

This riding elected the following members of the House of Commons of Canada:

Election results

|- 
  
|Liberal
|Robert James Watson
|align="right"| 2,410   
  
|Conservative
|James S. Freeborn
|align="right"|2,035    
|}

|- 
  
|Conservative
|James Arthurs 
|align="right"|  2,932    
  
|Liberal
|Robert James Watson 
|align="right"|  2,135   
|}

|- 
  
|Conservative
|James Arthurs 
|align="right"| 2,976    
  
|Liberal
|George Morrison
|align="right"|1,918   
|}

|- 
  
|Government (Unionist)
|James Arthurs 
|align="right"| 5,182  
  
|Opposition (Laurier Liberals)
|Norman Cecil Hocken 
|align="right"|2,043   
|}

|- 
  
|Conservative
|James Arthurs
|align="right"|  3,229    
 
|Independent
|William Robert Mason
|align="right"| 3,157   

|}

|- 
  
|Conservative
|James Arthurs
|align="right"| 5,224    
  
|Liberal
|William Robert Mason
|align="right"|3,922   
|}

|- 
  
|Conservative
|James Arthurs
|align="right"| 5,418    
  
|Liberal
|James Ludgate 
|align="right"|4,358   
|}

|- 
  
|Conservative
|James Arthurs
|align="right"| 5,504    
  
|Liberal
|Joseph Hilliar 
|align="right"| 4,365   
|}

|- 
  
|Liberal
|Arthur Slaght
|align="right"| 6,230   
  
|Conservative
|Milton Henry Limbert
|align="right"| 3,965    

|- 
  
|Liberal
|Arthur Slaght
|align="right"|5,850   

|National Government
|A. Coulter McLean
|align="right"|  4,159    
 
|New Democratic
|Clarence E. Culbert
|align="right"| 786   
|}

|- 
  
|Liberal
|Wilfred McDonald 
|align="right"| 5,301   
  
|Progressive Conservative
|A. Coulter McLean
|align="right"| 4,909    
 
|Co-operative Commonwealth
|Earle Torrie Taylor
|align="right"| 1,951   
|}

See also 

 List of Canadian federal electoral districts
 Past Canadian electoral districts

External links 

 Website of the Parliament of Canada

Former federal electoral districts of Ontario
1903 establishments in Ontario
1947 disestablishments in Ontario
Parry Sound District